The 38th Guangdong–Hong Kong Cup was held on 31 December 2015 and 3 January 2016. Guangdong won their 23rd title after winning 5–4 on aggregate.

Squads

Guangdong
 Head Coach:  Chen Yuliang
 Team Leader:  Ou Chuliang
 Assistant coach:  Li Zhihai,  Wu Yaqi,  Chen Daying,  Yao Debiao

Hong Kong
The final 21-man squad of Hong Kong was announced on 28 December 2015.
 Head Coach:  Liu Chun Fai

Match details

First leg

Second leg

Guangdong won 5–4 on aggregate.

References

2015–16 in Hong Kong football
2016
2016 in Chinese football